Musique Automatique is Stereo Total's fifth album. It was released on October 8, 2001 on Bobsled Records, and was re-released by Kill Rock Stars in 2002.

Track listing

Automatic Music 3:18
L'Amour A 3 3:12
Ma Radio 2:23
Wir Tanzen Im 4-Eck 1:59
Les Chansons D'A 3:38
Kleptomane 3:00
Adieu Adieu 3:22
Forever 16 1:43
Je Suis Une Poupée 2:37
Ich Weiss Nicht Mehr Genau 2:10
Le Diable 2:09
Nationale 7 2:19
Exakt Neutral 3:12
Ypsilon 3:55
Hep Onaltı 'Da 1:47
Love With The 3 Of Us 3:12

References

2001 albums
Stereo Total albums
Kill Rock Stars albums